Shefqet bey Vërlaci (15 December 1877, Elbasan, Manastir Vilayet, Ottoman Empire – 21 July 1946, Zürich, Switzerland), also known as Shevket Verlaci, was an Albanian politician and wealthy landowner.

Biography
In 1922, Vërlaci was the biggest landowner in Albania. He was the leader of the Progressive Party, the biggest conservative party in Albania, which firmly opposed any agrarian reform reducing the landowners' property. The Progressive Party included some North Albanian clan chiefs and prominent Muslim landowners as its members.

He was elected a deputy for the first time in the elections of April 5, 1921. In late 1922, Ahmed Zogu became engaged to Vërlaci's daughter, winning his support and the position of Prime Minister.

In early 1924, Zogu was forced to cede his position of Prime Minister to Vërlaci, because of a financial scandal and an attempt of assassination in which Zogu was injured. The date of Vërlaci taking the position of prime minister is 3 March 1924. Vërlaci held this position until 27 May of the same year and then fled to Italy. During Fan Noli's regime that followed, a special tribunal created by the government condemned Vërlaci to death in absentia along with the confiscation of all his property.

After being crowned King of Albania in 1928, Zogu broke his engagement with Vërlaci's daughter and instead marry Countess Géraldine, of the noble Apponyi family. This resulted in a very conflicting relationship between Zog and Vërlaci in the following years.

On 12 April 1939, after the Italian invasion of Albania, Vërlaci became the prime minister of the government of Albania formed under the Italian occupation. From 12 April through 16 April (until Italy's King Victor Emmanuel III accepted the Albanian crown), Vërlaci was the acting head of state. Vërlaci was also named by King Victor Emmanuel III senator of the kingdom of Italy.

On 28 November 1939, there was an anti-Italian, anti-Fascist and anti-government street demonstration in Tirana, supported by a strike of industrial and transport workers.

Vërlaci remained at the head of the government until 4 December (other sources cite 10 November or 3 December), 1941.

He died in 1946 in Zürich, Switzerland, and is buried in the Protestant Cemetery in Rome.

See also
 History of Albania

Notes

References

1877 births
1946 deaths
People from Elbasan
People from Manastir vilayet
Mekteb-i Mülkiye alumni
Albanian Sunni Muslims
Albanian Fascist Party politicians
Government ministers of Albania
Prime Ministers of Albania
Public Works ministers of Albania
World War II political leaders
Albanian collaborators with Fascist Italy
Ottoman Albanian nobility
Albanian anti-communists
Albanian fascists
Members of the Senate of the Kingdom of Italy
Congress of Durrës delegates